is a Japanese former politician of the Liberal Democratic Party, and a member of the House of Councillors in the Diet (2002–2010). He was a member of Prime Minister Abe's government, serving as his Parliamentary Secretary in the Cabinet Office of Economic and Fiscal Policy, where he worked toward opening up Japanese businesses to foreign investment. A native of Tottori, he received his BA from Waseda University, his MBA from Keio University, his MA from Yale, and his LLM from Duke Law School. He was elected to the House of Councillors for the first time in 2002.

References

External links 

 Kotaro Tamura's official blog in Japanese.
 

1963 births
Living people
Politicians from Tottori Prefecture
Keio University alumni
Waseda University alumni
Yale University alumni
Duke University School of Law alumni
Members of the House of Councillors (Japan)
Liberal Democratic Party (Japan) politicians